The 2004 NBL season was the 23rd season of the National Basketball League. The Auckland Stars won the championship in 2004 to claim their eighth league title.

Summary

Regular season standings

Playoff bracket

Awards

Player of the Week

Statistics leaders
Stats as of the end of the regular season

Regular season
 Most Valuable Player: Adrian Majstrovich (Hawke's Bay Hawks)
 NZ Most Valuable Player: Adrian Majstrovich (Hawke's Bay Hawks)
 Most Outstanding Guard: Lindsay Tait (Auckland Stars)
 Most Outstanding NZ Guard: Lindsay Tait (Auckland Stars)
 Most Outstanding Forward: Adrian Majstrovich (Hawke's Bay Hawks)
 Most Outstanding NZ Forward/Centre: Adrian Majstrovich (Hawke's Bay Hawks)
 Scoring Champion: Geordie Cullen (Waikato Titans)
 Rebounding Champion: David Cooper (Manawatu Jets)
 Assist Champion: Paul Henare (Hawke's Bay Hawks)
 Rookie of the Year: Luke Martin (Manawatu Jets)
 Coach of the Year: Shawn Dennis (Hawke's Bay Hawks)
 All-Star Five:
 G: Willie Banks (Taranaki Mountainairs)
 G: Lindsay Tait (Auckland Stars)
 F: Adrian Majstrovich (Hawke's Bay Hawks)
 F: Ben Knight (Wellington Saints)
 C: Geordie Cullen (Waikato Titans)

Playoffs
 Final MVP: Aaron Olson (Auckland Stars)

References

External links
Basketball New Zealand 2004 Results Annual
2004 NBL season preview
Broadcast of the 2004 final @ YouTube

National Basketball League (New Zealand) seasons
NBL